18th CFCA Awards 
January 9, 2005

Best Film: 
 Crash 

The 18th Chicago Film Critics Association Awards, given by the CFCA on January 9, 2006, honored the best in film for 2005.

Winners and nominees

Best Actor
Philip Seymour Hoffman – Capote
 Terrence Howard – Hustle & Flow
 Heath Ledger – Brokeback Mountain
 Joaquin Phoenix – Walk the Line
 David Strathairn – Good Night, and Good Luck.

Best Actress
Joan Allen – The Upside of Anger
 Felicity Huffman – Transamerica
 Keira Knightley – Pride & Prejudice
 Naomi Watts – King Kong
 Reese Witherspoon – Walk the Line

Best Cinematography
Brokeback Mountain – Rodrigo Prieto Good Night, and Good Luck. – Robert Elswit
 King Kong – Andrew Lesnie
 Munich – Janusz Kamiński
 The New World – Emmanuel Lubezki
 Pride & Prejudice – Roman Osin

Best DirectorDavid Cronenberg – A History of Violence
 George Clooney – Good Night, and Good Luck.
 Peter Jackson – King Kong
 Ang Lee – Brokeback Mountain
 Steven Spielberg – Munich

Best Documentary Film
Grizzly Man
 Enron: The Smartest Guys in the Room
 Mad Hot Ballroom
 March of the Penguins
 Murderball

Best Film
Crash
 Brokeback Mountain
 Good Night, and Good Luck.
 A History of Violence
 King Kong

Best Foreign Language Film
Caché (Hidden), France 2046, Hong Kong
 Downfall (Der Untergang), Germany
 Kung Fu Hustle (Kung fu), Hong Kong
 Oldboy, South Korea

Best Original ScoreBrokeback Mountain – Gustavo Santaolalla Batman Begins – Hans Zimmer and James Newton Howard
 Charlie and the Chocolate Factory – Danny Elfman
 King Kong – James Newton Howard
 Memoirs of a Geisha – John Williams

Best ScreenplayCrash – Paul Haggis and Bobby Moresco Brokeback Mountain – Larry McMurtry and Diana Ossana
 Capote – Dan Futterman
 Good Night, and Good Luck. – George Clooney and Grant Heslov
 A History of Violence – Josh Olson

Best Supporting ActorMickey Rourke – Sin City
 Matt Dillon – Crash
 Paul Giamatti – Cinderella Man
 Jake Gyllenhaal – Brokeback Mountain
 Terrence Howard – Crash
 Donald Sutherland – Pride & Prejudice

Best Supporting Actress
Maria Bello – A History of Violence
 Amy Adams – Junebug
 Scarlett Johansson – Match Point
 Catherine Keener – Capote
 Rachel Weisz – The Constant Gardener
 Michelle Williams – Brokeback Mountain

Most Promising Filmmaker
Bennett Miller – Capote
 Craig Brewer – Hustle & Flow
 Miranda July – Me and You and Everyone We Know
 Phil Morrison – Junebug
 Joe Wright – Pride & Prejudice

Most Promising Performer
Miranda July – Me and You and Everyone We Know
 Chris "Ludacris" Bridges – Crash and Hustle & Flow
 Georgie Henley – The Chronicles of Narnia: The Lion, the Witch and the Wardrobe
 Q'Orianka Kilcher – The New World
 Owen Kline – The Squid and the Whale

References
 http://moviecitynews.com/archived/awards/2006/cirtics_awards/chicago.html
 http://rogerebert.suntimes.com/apps/pbcs.dll/article?AID=/20060109/OSCARS/60109001
 https://web.archive.org/web/20120515203059/http://www.chicagofilmcritics.org/index.php?option=com_content&view=article&id=48&Itemid=58

 2005
2005 film awards